Life Begins is a Canadian short drama film, directed by Émile Proulx-Cloutier and released in 2009. The film centres on 24 hours in the life of a dysfunctional family who do not communicate well.

The film stars Jacques Girard as the father, and Maxime Dumontier, Vincent Proulx-Hébert and Anfée Tremblay-Proulx as his children.

The film premiered on August 11, 2009 at the Locarno Film Festival, and had its Canadian premiere at the 2009 Toronto International Film Festival.

Awards and nominations
It was also screened at the 2009 Festival du nouveau cinéma, where it received an honorable mention from the jury for the Best Canadian Short Film Award, and at the 2009 Whistler Film Festival, where it won the ShortWork Award.

The film was named to TIFF's year-end Canada's Top Ten list for 2009.

It was a Genie Award nominee for Best Live Action Short Drama at the 30th Genie Awards in 2010.

References

External links

2009 films
2009 short films
Canadian drama short films
Films shot in Quebec
Quebec films
French-language Canadian films
2000s Canadian films